Viva Elvis was the seventh resident Cirque du Soleil show on the Las Vegas Strip. It resided at the Aria Resort & Casino and premiered on February 19, 2010. The show closed on August 31, 2012.  Cirque du Soleil partnered with Elvis Presley Enterprises to produce this show, similar to how they partnered with The Beatles' Apple Corps Ltd to produce the resident show Love at the Mirage.

CKX, Inc., the company that owns the rights to Elvis Presley's name, likeness, and music publishing, signed an agreement to have Cirque du Soleil create the Elvis-themed residency show. The gala premiere was originally scheduled for January 2010 on what would have been Elvis' 75th birthday, but was postponed until February 19, 2010. CKX and Cirque du Soleil eventually intended to develop additional touring shows and multimedia interactive "Elvis Experiences" throughout the world.

Closure
Due to low attendance records for Viva Elvis, MGM Resorts asked Cirque du Soleil to replace the show. The show had its final performance on August 31, 2012. On March 7, 2012, Cirque du Soleil announced that following its second Radio City Music Hall engagement, the show Zarkana would be its replacement.

Set and technical information
The Elvis Theater was designed with a conventional proscenium layout reminiscent of an opera house.

It also incorporated a 50-foot-tall (15 m) video screen.

During "Got a Lot of Livin' to Do", seven trampolines were utilized.

The set for the "Jailhouse Rock" scene was based on the technical requirements for a circus art called marche inversée.

Acts
The acts for Viva Elvis were staged to the music of Elvis Presley.

 Opening
 Blue Suede Shoes: Dance number with acrobatics
 Don't Be Cruel: Dance number with German wheel
 One Night With You: Aerial frame, performed on a metal-frame guitar
 You'll Never Walk Alone: Interlude
 Saved: Dance number
 Got a Lot of Livin' to Do: Trampoline
 Heartbreak Hotel: Interlude
 Love Me Tender: Singing duet
 Return to Sender: Dance number with horizontal/parallel bars
 Are You Lonesome Tonight: Aerial pas de deux
 Western Medley: Gun twirling and Lassos
 Burning Love: Band interlude
 Bossa Nova Baby: Balancing on chairs
 King Creole: Dance number with diabolo
 Jailhouse Rock: Dance number with acrobatics (Viva Elvis centerpiece)
 It's Now or Never: Chinese poles
 Can't Help Falling in Love: Interlude
 Love Me/Don't: Duo cerceaux
 Viva Las Vegas: Dance number
 Suspicious Minds: Acrobatic dance duet
 Rock Medley: Banquine
 Hound Dog: Finale
 Such A Night: Bonus Finale

Costumes
Viva Elvis costume designer, Stefano Canulli, drew inspiration from the iconic Elvis fashion of the 1950s and 1960s and added Technicolor lines to highlight the human body.  The wardrobe collection as a whole contained nearly 400 costumes and around 1,500 costume components.  Part of this total came from more than 450 pairs of shoes and 150 custom wigs.  Cirque du Soleil, for the first time, used flocking to create some of the accessories, thus giving them a velvet appearance.  Some of the several wigs used for the show were created using urethane foam, which gave them the appearance of Japanese manga.

Music
The music for Viva Elvis was created in partnership with Elvis Presley Enterprises.  The soundtrack album, which was released on November 5, 2010, was released under Sony Legacy Recordings and was produced by Erich van Tourneau.List of music included in the show (In alphabetical order):'''

 All Shook Up (Banquine) Also Sprach Zarathustra (Opening) Are You Lonesome Tonight (Aerial pas de deux) Baby Let's Play House (Gun twirling and Lassos, Trampoline) Baby What You Want Me To Do (Gun twirling and Lassos) Blue Moon (Aerial pas de deux) Blue Moon Of Kentucky (Gun twirling and lassos) Blue Suede Shoes (Dance Number with acrobatics, Banquine) Bossa Nova Baby (Balancing on chairs) Burning Love (Film montage and band interlude)
 Can't Help Falling In Love (Interlude)
Didja Ever (Dance number with horizontal/parallel bars)
Don't (Duo cerceaux)
Don't Be Cruel (Dance number with German wheel)
Don't Cry Daddy
First In Line
Follow That Dream
Frankfort Special (Dance number with horizontal/parallel bars)
Good Rockin' Tonight (Trampoline)
Got A Lot O' Livin To Do (Trampoline)
Heartbreak Hotel (Intelude, Banquine)
Hound Dog (Finale)
I am Roustabout
I Don't Care If The Sun Don't Shine (Gun twirling and lassos)
I Got A Woman
It's Now Or Never (Chinese poles)
Jailhouse Rock (Dance number with acrobatics)
King Creole (Diabolo)
Love Me (Duo cerceaux)
Love Me Tender (Singing duet)
My Baby Left Me
Mystery Train (Gun twirling and lassos)
One Night (Aerial frame)
Polk Salad Annie
Return To Sender (Dance number with horizontal/parallel bars)
Saved (Dance number)
Shake Rattle And Roll (Trampoline)
So High (Dance number)
Such A Night (Bonus Finale)
Surrender
Suspicious Minds (Acrobatic dance duet)
That's All Right (Banquine)
Tiger Man (Gun twirling and lassos)
Too Much (Dance number with German wheel)
Treat Me Nice
Trouble (Banquine)
Trying To Get To You (Gun twirling and lassos)
Viva Las Vegas (Dance number)
You'll Never Walk Alone (Interlude)

References

External links

 Official Cirque du Soleil site
 Official site for Viva Elvis Album

Cirque du Soleil resident shows
Cultural depictions of Elvis Presley
Production shows in the Las Vegas Valley
Las Vegas shows